Hartland-Lakeside Joint No. 3 School District, also known as the Hartland-Lakeside School District, is a school district headquartered in Hartland, Wisconsin.

The district includes the majority of Hartland as well as portions of Delafield Town and Merton Town. It feeds into the Arrowhead High School District.

History

The district formerly allowed special education students to attend other school districts, but in 2003 it rescinded almost all such permissions.

Nancy Nikolay is the superintendent; she started work for the school district in 2013 and initially was the assistant superintendent. In 2023 she announced that she would not remain in her position after the end of the school year.

Schools
 North Shore Middle School
 Hartland North Elementary School
 Hartland South Elementary School

References

External links
 Hartland-Lakeside School District

School districts in Wisconsin
Education in Waukesha County, Wisconsin